Labeobarbus matris is a species of ray-finned fish in the genus Labeobarbus which is endemic to the Athi River in Kenya. It may be conspecific with Labeobarbus mariae.

References 

 

matris
Fish described in 1928